The 1910 Copa del Rey Final (FEF) was the 9th final of the Spanish cup competition, the Copa del Rey (although technically there was no final, with the tournament being played as a mini-group of three teams). It was one of two rival Cup competitions played in that year due to disagreements between the reigning champion of the tournament, Club Ciclista de San Sebastián, and some of the clubs invited.

The final was played at Tiro del Pichón in Madrid on 26 May 1910. The match was contested by FC Barcelona and Español de Madrid. The latter netted twice in the opening 15 minutes thanks to a brace from Vicente Buylla, thus leading the match 0–2 down at the break, but Barça fought back and scored three goals in the second half to complete a great emotional comeback, thus lifting the trophy for the first time with a 3–2 victory. The Barça goals were scored by Charles Wallace, Carles Comamala and Pepe Rodríguez, who netted the winner in the last-minute.

This was the "official" competition, organised by the newly-created FEF (Federación Española de Fútbol), later Royal Spanish Football Federation, in Madrid. Both its winner, and that of the rival UECF (Unión Española de Clubes de Fútbol) in San Sebastián played two months earlier, are currently recognised as official by the RFEF.

Match details 

|}

See also
1910 UECF Copa del Rey Final
1913 FEF Copa del Rey Final

References

Copa Del Rey Final
Copa del Rey Finals
Copa Del Rey Final 1910
Copa Del Rey Final 1910